Thomas Crow may refer to:

Thomas E. Crow (born 1948), American art historian and art critic
Thomas S. Crow (1934–2008), Master Chief Petty Officer of the U.S. Navy
Thomas Crow (cricketer) (born 1931), Australian cricketer

See also
Thomas Crow Hundley, mayor of Hamburg, Arkansas